Ferrell is an English surname of Irish origin.

Origin
The name is possibly derived from the patronym Ó Fearghail (meaning "descendant of Fearghail", whose name means "man of valour"), however the anglicised forms of Ó Fearghail are principally O'Farrell and Farrell, and some genetic testing has found the Ferrell lineage to be genetically different from the Farrell lineage (see the Farrell DNA Project R-BY34900). Employees of a given immigration registry may have simply spelled Farrell incorrectly, however this would be an extensive case of systemic error, given the number of Ferrells in the US. The Ferrell name may have otherwise evolved from the surname Ferril, with a 1701 ship's passenger list noting one Jane Ferril's arrival in New York.

Surname

 Andy Ferrell (1984), English footballer
 Clelin Ferrell (born 1997), American football player
 Conchata Ferrell (1943–2020), American actress
 Jami Ferrell (born 1974), American model
 John H. Ferrell (1829–1900), American recipient of the Medal Of Honor
 Mary Ferrell (1922–2004), American historian
 Monica Ferrell (born 1975), American poet and fiction writer
 Rachelle Ferrell (born 1964), American singer
 Richard Allan Ferrell (1926–2005), American theoretical physicist
 Rick Ferrell (1905–1995), American baseball player
 Robert H. Ferrell (1921–2018), American historian
 Rod Ferrell (born 1980), American murderer
 Tyra Ferrell (born 1962), American actress
 Wes Ferrell (1908–1976), American baseball player
 Will Ferrell (born 1967), American comedian and actor

See also
 Ferrel (disambiguation), including a list of people with the surname

References